Enrico Baiano (Naples, 1960) is an Italian harpsichordist and fortepianist, known on the international stage as a virtuoso and strict interpreter of early music.

Baiano has earned a number of international awards including the Deutsche Schallplattenpreis, Diapason d'Or, Choc de la Musique and Platte des Monats. He has written Method for Harpsichord: A practical guide for Pianists, Organists and Harpsichordists published by Ut Orpheus and translated into five languages. He has performed at the most renowned early music festivals in Europe, Israel and Japan with repertoire ranging from 16th to 21st century. He is one of the co-founders of the Italian ensemble "Cappella della Pietà dei Turchini", with whom he has played and recorded from 1986 to 2000. He has also played with the Neapolitan contemporary music ensemble "Dissonanzen", with Piccolo concerto "Wien" and with the Helsinki Baroque Orchestra.
He took part in two documentary films directed by Francesco Leprino: 'Un gioco ardito - dodici variazioni tematiche su Domenico Scarlatti' and ‘Sul nome B.a.c.h.’.

Discography 
1995 - Pietro Domenico Paradisi, Sonatas for harpsichord - 1754 (Glossa)
1996 - Johann Jakob Froberger, Diverse curiose partite (Symphonia)
1998 - Antonio de Cabezon, Obras de Musica para Tecla (Glossa)
1999 - Domenico Scarlatti, Sonate per clavicembalo K46, K109, K126, K175, K181, K217, K232, K233, K248, K249, K295, K296, K394, K395, K402, K439, K516 (Symphonia)
2000 - Antonio Vivaldi, Concertos for harpsichord solo (Panclassics)
2001 - Musica al tempo di Luca Giordano - Il cembalo nella Napoli del'600 (Symphonia)
2003 - Girolamo Frescobaldi, Toccate, Partite, Canzoni (Symphonia)
2008 - Domenico Scarlatti, Sonate per clavicembalo K3, K24, K69, K99, K113, K115, K118, K119, K120, K132, K148, K149, K184, K213, K214, K215, K216, K268 (Symphonia)
2009 Domenico Scarlatti, Sonatas (harpsichord and fortepiano) K96, K124, K125, K141, K386, K387, K426, K427, K445, K481, K482, K 516, K517, K544, K545, K546, K547 (Stradivarius 33844)

Publications 
2010 Method for Harpsichord. A practical guide for Pianists, Organists and Harpsichordists - UtOrpheus, Bologna.
2014 (with Marco Moiraghi) Le Sonate di Domenico Scarlatti - Testo, contesto, interpretazione - LIM, Lucca http://lim.it/

References

Italian harpsichordists
Italian performers of early music
Living people
Year of birth missing (living people)